The 2021 FIBA Under-16 Americas Championship was the men's international basketball competition that was held in Xalapa, Mexico from 23 to 29 August 2021. The top four teams qualified for the 2022 FIBA Under-17 Basketball World Cup in Spain.

Qualification

Eight teams from three sub zones were qualified through the Nike Youth Ranking for each sub-zone.

Draw
The draw ceremony for the competition took place on August 10th at the FIBA Regional Office, in the city of Miami, Florida.

Group phase

All times are local (UTC−5).

Group A

Group B

Knockout stage

Bracket

Quarterfinals

5–8th place semifinals

Semifinals

Seventh place game

Fifth place game

Third place game

Final

Final ranking

Statistical leaders

Players

Points

Rebounds

Assists

Steals

Blocks

Other statistical leaders

Awards

 Most Valuable Player: 
  Robert Dillingham
 All-Star Five:
 Guard  Robert Dillingham
 Forward  Ronald Holland
 PG  Mikkel Tyne
 PG  Danny Carbuccia
 PF  Tiziano Prome

See also
 2021 FIBA Under-16 Women's Americas Championship

References

External links
 LatinBasket.com

FIBA Americas Under-16 Championship
International basketball competitions hosted by Mexico
Youth sport in Mexico
August 2021 sports events in North America
2021 in youth sport
2021 in basketball